The 2023 Christy Ring Cup is due to be the 19th staging of the Christy Ring Cup since its establishment by the Gaelic Athletic Association in 2005. The cup is planned to begin in April 2023 and end in June 2023.

The 2023 Christy Ring Cup is due to be played on a Round-Robin basis. The counties who finish in the top two places shall qualify for the final, with the winner being promoted to the Joe McDonagh Cup. The bottom placed team in the Round Robin is relegated to the Nicky Rackard Cup.

Team changes

To Championship
Relegated from the Joe McDonagh Cup

 Meath

Promoted from the Nicky Rackard Cup

 Tyrone

From Championship
Promoted to the Joe McDonagh Cup

 Kildare

Relegated to the Nicky Rackard Cup

 Wicklow

Group stage
{| class="wikitable" style="text-align:center"
!width=20|
!width=150 style="text-align:left;"|Team
!width=20|
!width=20|
!width=20|
!width=20|
!width=40|
!width=40|
!width=20|
!width=20|
!Qualification
|- style="background:#ccffcc"
|1
| style="text-align:left" |  Derry
| 0
| 0
| 0
| 0
| 0
| 0
| 0
| 0
| rowspan="2" |Advance to Knockout Stage
|- style="background:#ccffcc"
|2
| style="text-align:left" |  London
| 0
| 0
| 0
| 0
| 0
| 0
| 0
| 0
|-
|3
| style="text-align:left" |  Mayo
| 0
| 0
| 0
| 0
| 0
| 0
| 0
| 0
| rowspan="3" |
|-
|4
| style="text-align:left" | Meath
| 0
| 0
| 0
| 0
| 0
| 0
| 0
| 0
|-
|5
|  style="text-align:left" | Sligo
| 0
| 0
| 0
| 0
| 0
| 0
| 0
| 0
|- style="background:#ffcccc" 
|6
| style="text-align:left" |  Tyrone
| 0
| 0
| 0
| 0
| 0
| 0
| 0
| 0
|Relegated to Nicky Rackard Cup
|}

Knockout stage

Final

The winning team is scheduled for promotion to the 2024 Joe McDonagh Cup.

References

Christy Ring Cup
Christy Ring Cup
Christy Ring Cup